Júlianna ("Júlia") Tudja (born 13 October 1979 in Vác, Pest) is a female hammer thrower from Hungary. Her personal best is 67.52 metres, achieved in April 2004 in Walnut, California.

Achievements

References

External links

sports-reference

1979 births
Living people
Hungarian female hammer throwers
Athletes (track and field) at the 2004 Summer Olympics
Olympic athletes of Hungary
Competitors at the 2003 Summer Universiade
People from Vác
Sportspeople from Pest County
21st-century Hungarian women